TV Is My Parent is the first video release by Australian singer-songwriter Sia, released on DVD in May 2009 through Starbucks' record label Hear Music and Sia's own Monkey Puzzle. The album features a live concert recorded at the Hiro Ballroom in New York City in 2007, four music videos and additional "behind the scenes" footage. It was released following Sia's 2008 studio album Some People Have Real Problems and Live from Sydney EP, released digitally via iTunes, also in May 2009. TV Is My Parent won the 2009 ARIA Music Award for Best Music DVD.

Content
TV Is My Parent is 95 minutes in length and consists of a live concert filmed at the Hiro Ballroom in New York City on 12 September 2007, four music videos and additional "behind the scenes" footage, in a section titled "Where the Magic Happens", from Sia's North American tour in 2008. Songs performed during the concert include ones from Sia's 2008 album Some People Have Real Problems, its 2004 predecessor Colour the Small One, and her collaborations with Zero 7. Audio of the concert was mixed into 5.1 surround sound.

Release 
Sia announced the release of the TV Is My Parent on 9 March 2009, and released its trailer on 23 April. The DVD was released in Europe on 18 May 2009, in the United States the following day, and in Australia on 13 June. In 2012, some online music stores offered the DVD as a bonus with the purchase of her greatest hits album Best Of....

Reception
Writing for website The Digital Fix, Luke McNaney described the DVD as "above average" and praised both Sia and the directors for the "peculiar and worthwhile visions" included in it. The Dwarfs Daniel Townsend wrote that the show delivers a "healthy dose of all things Sia". Thom Holmes of Contactmusic.com expressed his opinion that fans of Sia would "love" TV Is My Parent, though he struggled to understand why, and that watching the DVD was "laborious". Lindsay Zoladz mentioned in her Vulture review of Sia's 2016 album, This Is Acting, that the DVD shows Sia as a "bubbly and loquacious" person who is "twitchy but comfortable in her skin".

TV Is My Parent earned Sia the 2009 ARIA Music Award for Best Music DVD. Sia stated: "I so didn't expect to win."

Credits and personnel 
Credits adapted from section 4 of the TV Is My Parent DVD.

Concert 

Band

 Sia Furler – vocals
 Sam Dixon – bass
 Felix Bloxsom – drums
 Gus Seyffert – guitar
 Brian LeBarton – keyboards
 Oliver Kraus – cello
 Lucia Ribisi – guest vocals on "Little Black Sandals"

Touring crew

 David Russell – manager
 Ian Faddie – tour manager
 Deanne Franklin – front of house
 Chad Smith – lighting designer
 David Smith – backline technician

Film crew

 Nicholas Wrathall – director, producer
 Josh Heydemann – production manager
 Al Gurdon – lighting designer
 Andrew Shulkind – director of photography
 David Korins – set designer
 Rod Lemmond – set design assistant
 Jenna Rossi – wardrobe
 Francelle Daley – artist makeup
 Eron Otcasek – editor
 Emery Dobyns – audio editor
 John McCann – floor manager
 Mark Emerson – production coordinator
 John Rogers – technical director

Music videos 

 "Buttons"

 Kris Moyes – director
 The Directors Bureau – production company

 "Day Too Soon"

 Cat Solen – director
 Partizan Entertainment – production company

 "The Girl You Lost to Cocaine"

 Kris Moyes – director
 The Directors Bureau – production company

 "Soon We'll be Found"

 Claire Carré – director
 Partizan Entertainment – production company

DVD 

 Kate Fenhalls – producer
 Hangman Studios – designed by, authored by
 James Tonkin – designer, author
 Alan Witts – 5.1 audio mix
 Dallas Clayton – artwork elements drawn by
 Leo Krikhaar – artwork layout
 ie:music Ltd – management
 Monkey Puzzle Records Ltd – record company
 Michael Loney – "ears and eyes"
 Tim Clark – executive producer
 David Enthoven – executive producer
 David Russell – executive producer
 Sia Furler – executive producer

Track listing
Track listing adapted from Amazon; songwriting credits adapted from DVD credits.

Release history

See also

 Music of Australia
 Zero 7 discography

References

External links
 
 
 
 

2009 video albums
ARIA Award-winning albums
Electronic video albums
Hear Music video albums
Live video albums
Pop rock video albums
Sia (musician) albums
Video albums by Australian artists